Eve Merriam (July 19, 1916 – April 11, 1992) was an American poet and writer.

Writing career
Merriam's first book was the 1946 Family Circle, which won the Yale Younger Poets Prize. Her book, The Inner City Mother Goose, was described as one of the most banned books of the time. It inspired a 1971 Broadway musical called Inner City, later revived in 1982 under the title Street Dreams. In 1956, she published Emma Lazarus: Woman with a Torch. 

In 1981, she won the NCTE Award for Excellence in Poetry for Children. One of her books for children is Halloween ABC. She published over 30 books, and taught at both City College and New York University.

Her play Out of Our Father's House, based on her book Growing Up Female in America, was televised in the Great Performances series in 1978.

Personal life
Born Eva Montgomery in Philadelphia, Pennsylvania, Eve Merriam was one of four children of Russian immigrants Max Moscovitz and Jennie Siegel. After graduating with an A.B. from the University of Pennsylvania in 1937,  Merriam moved to New York to pursue graduate studies at Columbia University. She was married for a time to writer Leonard C. Lewin. She later married screenwriter Waldo Salt and was actress Jennifer Salt's stepmother.

Death
Merriam died on April 11, 1992 in Manhattan from liver cancer.

References

Core biographical material
 "Eve Merriam, Poet and Author Who Wrote for Children, Is Dead," Bruce Lambert, The New York Times, April 13, 1992.
 Heffer, Helen Ruth Julian.  A Checklist of Works by and about Eve Merriam.  Master's thesis, University of Maryland, 1980.  Includes 84-page biographical essay.
 Copeland, J. S., Speaking of Poets: Interviews with Poets Who Write for Children and Young Adults (1993).
 short biography from Wisconsin Writers' Collection at MITH
 Biography at Jewish Women's Archive
 “Eve Merriam.”  In Anne Commire, ed., Something About the Author, vol. 40.  Detrolt: Gale Research Co., 1985.

In other works
 Randy Shilts.  The Mayor of Castro Street: The Life & Times of Harvey Milk (New York: St. Martins, 1982).
 Kate Weigand.  Red Feminism: American Communism and the Making of Women's Liberation (Baltimore: Johns Hopkins University Press, 2001).

Archival materials
 Finding Aid for holdings related to Eve Merriam in the University of Minnesota Libraries Children's Literature Research Collection
 Papers, 1840-1978 (inclusive), 1930-1978 (bulk): A Finding Aid.Schlesinger Library , Radcliffe Institute, Harvard University.
 Additional papers, 1960-1984 (inclusive), 1978-1984 (bulk): A Finding Aid.Schlesinger Library , Radcliffe Institute, Harvard University.
 Additional papers of Eve Merriam, ca.1930-1992: A Finding Aid.Schlesinger Library , Radcliffe Institute, Harvard University.
 Audiovisual collection of Eve Merriam, 1964-1992: A Finding Aid.Schlesinger Library , Radcliffe Institute, Harvard University.

Notes

1916 births
1992 deaths
20th-century American poets
University of Pennsylvania alumni
Writers from Philadelphia
Writers from Manhattan
Deaths from cancer in New York (state)
Jewish American writers
American women poets
Yale Younger Poets winners
20th-century American women writers
Children's poets
20th-century American Jews